Helen Darbishire,  (1881–1961) was an English literary scholar, who was Principal of Somerville College, Oxford, from 1931 until her retirement in 1945.

Life
Helen Darbishire was born in Oxford, the daughter of Samuel Dukinfield Darbishire, a physician at the Radcliffe Infirmary. She was educated at Oxford Girls' High School before going as a scholar to Somerville College, Oxford, where she graduated first-class in English in 1903. After being a visiting lecturer at Royal Holloway College, she returned to Somerville as a tutor in English in 1908. She was the first woman to be chair of the faculty board of English at Oxford University. In 1925-6 she held a visiting professorship at Wellesley College. On her return to Oxford she was appointed university lecturer. 

In 1931 she succeeded Margery Fry as principal of Somerville, resigning her university lectureship (though continuing to teach and lecture). Darbishire remained principal of Somerville until her retirement in 1945, overseeing considerable building expansion at the college. 

Her work as a literary scholar focussed on Milton and Wordsworth. She became a trustee of Dove Cottage and eventually moved to the Lake District.

Honours
In 1947, Darbishire was elected a Fellow of the British Academy (FBA). In the 1955 Birthday Honours, she was appointed a Commander of the Order of the British Empire (CBE).

Works
 The early lives of Milton, 1932
The poet Wordsworth, 1949
 The poetical works of John Milton: with translations of the Italian, Latin and Greek poems from the Columbia University edition, 1952

References

External links
 

1881 births
1961 deaths
Principals of Somerville College, Oxford
People educated at Oxford High School, England
Alumni of Somerville College, Oxford
Commanders of the Order of the British Empire
Fellows of the British Academy
Rose Mary Crawshay Prize winners